Bark Like a Dog is the eighth studio album by the American punk rock band Screeching Weasel. It was released in 1996 through Fat Wreck Chords. It was the band's first album released through Fat Wreck Chords. It was also the band's first album since they disbanded for the second time. The split lasted just over a year, and during that time 3/4 of the band (all minus Jughead) played together in the Riverdales. It was the band's only album to ever place a ranking on the Billboard Charts.

Track listing 
All songs by Ben Weasel, except where noted.

 "Get off My Back" (Ben Weasel/Dan Vapid) – 2:38
 "Cool Kids" – 2:13
 "First Day of Summer" – 3:38
 "You'll Be in My Dreams Today" – 2:38
 "You Blister My Paint" – 3:20
 "Stupid Girl" – 2:38
 "Phasers on Kill" – 2:29
 "Handcuffed to You" – 3:25
 "(She Got) Electroshocked" – 2:27
 "It's Not Enough" – 3:52
 "I Will Always Be There" – 2:38
 "Your Name Is Tattooed on My Heart" – 2:46

Chart performance

Personnel 
 Ben Weasel - lead vocals, guitar
 Jughead - guitar
 Dan Vapid - bass, backing vocals
 Dan Panic - drums, backing vocals
 Teakettle Jones - keyboards on "Cool Kids" (Teakettle Jones are Ben Weasel & Mass Giorgini playing together)
 Jimmy Spectacular - keyboards on "The First Day of Summer" (Jimmy Spectacular is Ben Weasel)

External links 
[ Billboard Heatseekers Chart]

References 

1996 albums
Screeching Weasel albums
Fat Wreck Chords albums